Tchórzew-Kolonia  is a village in the administrative district of Gmina Borki, within Radzyń Podlaski County, Lublin Voivodeship, in eastern Poland.

The village has a population of 800.

References

Villages in Radzyń Podlaski County